Craterostigmus crabilli is a species of small centipede in the order Craterostigmomorpha. It is endemic to New Zealand.

Appearance 
C. crabilli is a small centipede, and is generally smaller than its Tasmanian counterpart in the genus, C. tasmanianus. According to a 2008 paper, the largest specimen recorded had a body length of 3.7 cm, however, other sources say C. crabilli can attain 5 cm in length. It is variable in colour, and the body can range from pale orange to shades of brown. The head is reddish brown and large, and the maxillipedes (forcipules) are extremely large and clearly visible from above.

Taxonomy 
C. crabilli is one of two species in the order Craterostigmomorpha. It was named in honour of the deceased Ralph E. Crabill Jr (1925-1992), who intended to describe the species within his lifetime.

References 

Animals described in 2008
Centipedes of New Zealand